Robert Thomas Harms (1932 – October 5, 2016) was an American linguist and emeritus professor of linguistics at University of Texas at Austin. He is known for his research on grammar of Estonian and phonological theory.

Books
 Introduction to Phonological Theory, 1968
 Estonian Grammar, 1962
 Finnish Structural Sketch, 1964

References

Phoneticians
University of Texas at Austin faculty
1932 births
Communication scholars
Linguists from the United States
American phonologists
University of Chicago alumni
Linguists of Finnish
Linguists of Estonian
2016 deaths